Beijing Huajia University is a university in Huairou District, Beijing, founded in 1985 as Beijing Zhongshan University by the Revolutionary Committee of the Chinese Kuomintang. In June 2010, they named Korean actress Jang Na-ra as an associate professor.

References

External links
Official site

Educational institutions established in 1985
Universities and colleges in Beijing
1985 establishments in China